Adriana Comolli (born 15 December 1951) is an Argentine former swimmer. She competed in the women's 100 metre backstroke and women's 100 metre butterfly events at the 1968 Summer Olympics.

References

1951 births
Living people
Argentine female swimmers
Female backstroke swimmers
Female butterfly swimmers
Olympic swimmers of Argentina
Swimmers at the 1968 Summer Olympics
Sportspeople from Rosario, Santa Fe
20th-century Argentine women